Two ships of the Royal Navy have been named HMS Marksman. Another was planned but never completed:

She was projected in 1913, but not ordered.
 was a  launched in 1915 and sold for breaking up in 1921.
HMS Marksman was to have been an M-class destroyer. She was damaged while under construction in 1941, was salvaged, renamed  and launched in 1942 and was sunk in 1944.

Royal Navy ship names